Iryna Malovichko (born 6 December 1993) is a Ukrainian sport shooter. She qualified to represent Ukraine at the 2020 Summer Olympics in Tokyo 2021, competing in women's skeet.

At the 2022 World Shotgun Championships Malovichko finished 5th in women's skeet and earned first Olympic quota for Ukraine at the 2024 Olympics.

References

 

1993 births
Living people
Ukrainian female sport shooters
Shooters at the 2020 Summer Olympics
Olympic shooters of Ukraine
21st-century Ukrainian women